The Johor Bahru Eastern Dispersal Link Expressway   is a controlled-access highway entirely within Johor Bahru, Johor, Malaysia. The  expressway connects the end of the North–South Expressway Southern Route at Pandan to the Johor–Singapore Causeway in the city centre. The expressway was constructed to allow cross-border traffic to bypass the city centre and reduce congestion along Tebrau Highway, the existing main route to the causeway. The construction costs of the expressway is RM 1 billion.

In August 2012, the Malaysian government decided that it will acquire the expressway from Malaysia Resources Corp Bhd (MRCB).

The Kilometre Zero of the entire expressway is located after the CIQ Interchange before the Sultan Iskandar Building towards the Malaysia-Singapore border.

History
The construction of the Johor Bahru Eastern Dispersal Link was proposed in 2004 in the Ninth Malaysia Plan (2006–2010). The construction began on 1 October 2007 and was completed on 20 March 2012. On 1 April 2012, the highway was opened to public.

Controversies
Houses along Jalan Sri Pelangi Satu and Jalan Sri Pelangi Dua had been reclaimed by the government due to the necessity to use the land for the project. The compensation sum given to the owners of the houses was considered low by many of the residents there. However, no further adjustments was made to the sum.

Another major controversy is that only the motorists who use the CIQ complex to travel to Singapore will be charged the toll; whether or not the EDL is used. However, on 30 August 2012, five months after the EDL was opened to public, the controversy was resolved when the government announced that they will take over the EDL from MRCB. On 1 January 2018, toll collections at JB Eastern Dispersal Link was abolished and replaced by Road Charge on every Singapore car that enters Malaysia.

List of interchanges 
Below is a list of interchanges (exits), laybys and rest and service areas along the Johor Bahru Eastern Dispersal Link Expressway. The exits are arranged in ascending numerical order from north to south.

The entire section is located within the district of Johor Bahru, Johor.

References

External links
EDL Connects website
Privatation Study by Perunding Trafik Klasik

2012 establishments in Malaysia
Expressways and highways in Johor
Johor Bahru